Nightingale is a 2014 American drama film directed by Elliott Lester and written by Frederick Mensch. The film stars David Oyelowo. The film premiered on HBO on May 29, 2015.

Plot

The movie begins with Peter Snowden, a man in his late 30s, recording a video of his confession to murdering his mother. He explains that she was unwilling to allow him, an equal contributor to their household expenses, to have the house to himself for the purpose of entertaining an old military buddy. He goes on to explain that he feels no guilt for the crime but does regret the amount of blood. Peter appears to be a type of vlogger, as he admonishes himself that he can not upload this video and shuts the camera off.

The next day, Peter sits at the kitchen table singing happily and enjoying a bowl of what appears to be Froot Loops. And as he heads off to work, he seems to forget for a moment that the previous night he murdered his mother, because he calls to her closed bedroom door to let her know he's leaving. His face registers the new reality.

Peter returns from work venting about his day, but reassures himself that no one will ruin his good mood because he is about to prepare a great meal because he deserves it. For the second time in the film, the viewing audience notice that Peter sings songs to himself that are more suited to the 1960s or '70s and are no longer current hits. And later his wardrobe will validate that he is stuck in another time period. Peter sits down to enjoy his meal but appears to be lonely as he sits at the dinner table. The next scene is Peter sitting in front of the television, attempting to watch something but realizing he needs his glasses. As he checks his pockets and the cushions on the couch, his facial expression lets us know he remembers where they are and that he dreads going to retrieve them. He quickly goes into his mother's room and comes out with glasses covered in his mother's blood.

The next scene introduces us to Edward. Peter practices calling Edward several times, inviting him over for the dinner he was asking his mother to allow him, which led to her murder. After getting the courage to dial the number, he reaches Edward's wife, Gloria. He makes small talk asking about the children and then asks to speak with Edward. After being told he was unavailable, he leaves a message and begins recording for his online audience, letting them know he has no expectation that she will give Edward the message. He decides that Edward will come to dinner on Friday, even though they have not spoken. He even begins contemplating a menu.

The next day, the doorbell wakes Peter and a package is left at the door. It is a makeup mirror his mother obviously ordered before she died. The mirror seems to represent her throughout the remainder of the movie. It resides on the kitchen table where his mother may have sat during their morning meals; he speaks to it often as if it were she. He receives a call from his sister, Vickie, and thus begin conversations with the outside world where he lies and deceives others about the whereabouts of his mother. He tells Vickie that their mother is out and complains about the purchase of the mirror.

Peter, drinking and smoking, relishing in the good fortune of having the house to himself for the very first time, begins a barrage of phone calls to Edward's answering machine. He shares how much he misses him and goes from pleading for a return call to cursing Gloria for standing in the way of his friendship with Edward.

The next morning, the scent of rotting flesh coming from underneath his mother's door begins to become unbearable and Peter stuffs a towel in the crack. He goes off to work and returns with an iPhone and a bluetooth headset. That evening, he retrieves the mail and notices a letter to his mother. After preparing a cup of tea and telling the mirror/mother to hold on, he opens the letter and reads it. It's from an old friend, Charlene Carruthers, from Mobile, AL telling Lillian, his mother, about the goings on in Mobile and expresses concerns she and her husband have about the last letter from Lillian. They pray Peter will meet a Christian woman to marry, and that Lillian should not love Peter more than God and thus allow him to do anything against God's will. The letter is so upsetting to Peter that he types a response from his mother to Charlene. The letter states what a good son he is, that he takes excellent care of her and that he had his friend Edward over for a wonderful dinner for the three of them.

Peter decides to use his new iPhone to make another attempt to reach Edward and is finally successful. His joy is palpable when he turns his face to the wall and tells Edward how badly he's missed him. He explains that he's called for days and that Gloria has been preventing his calls from being received. He shares the news that his mother has "moved away" and that he wants him to come to dinner to celebrate. Miraculously, Edward is available the very day he told his online viewers, Friday.

Now Peter has to prepare the house for his dinner guest and, first things first, mother must be removed from the house. He wraps her in his grandmother's quilt, caresses her hand for the last time, and drags her from the room. As he leaves, we see a lock on the door as if Lillian had been afraid of Peter and locked her door to keep him out. He puts her in the trunk of the car, along with a shovel, and drives away, presumably to bury her. The next day he calls Vickie on his new phone and, after explaining to her that their mother knows about the phone and that they are not paupers who cannot afford it, he shares the good news that he and mother are redecorating the house. We learn that their father left them 30 years ago and that Peter is not concerned about the costs of the work, as it will just be billed to his MasterCard. Peter vents to mother via the mirror about his frustration with all the work he will have to do on the house and that this could have been done 10 years ago with the money from the settlement. A call from Mrs. Carruthers from Mobile interrupts his lunch; again he lies about his mother's whereabouts.

Peter tells his online viewers about his exciting dinner plans, possible menu items, and thanks them for their comments. Then he introduces them in a later video to the tropical fish he bought for Edward to make his home a sanctuary for him. Adam and Eve are the fishes' names; Adam the fish has just left his wife. Peter goes through the house the next day looking for the espresso machine. He explains to his viewers that he and Edward love an after dinner espresso and explodes over his mother having hidden it from him out of spite. He unsuccessfully tries to purchase a new one over the phone, but he has charged his MasterCard to the limit and cannot get approved for an increase. He finally locates the machine in the attic.

Sitting outside on the patio, Peter finally shares with his viewers the story of meeting Edward. We find out that he was in the military with Edward. He explains that the military was too difficult for him, which seems to mean he was discharged. That, coupled with the murder and his medications, implies mental health issues that may have contributed to his leaving the military. Peter alludes to a misunderstanding he and Edward had that they need to resolve.

The next day, Peter is painting the dining room and explaining to Vickie why their mother does not want to talk to her anymore. He attempts to convince her to send him money for an airline ticket so they can send their mother to Mobile to visit Mrs. Carruthers. Later that day, Mrs Beasley from church calls to check on Lillian because she missed bridge at church. Peter explains she has been ill and rushes off the phone when the eggs he's cooking begin burning on the stove. Peter ends his night with prayer.

The next day, the BIG DAY, we see Peter with a new look. His hair is texturized, similar to styles in the 1960s and '70s, reinforcing that he is out of date with his look. He begins singing around the house as he cooks, cleans, and works out. He has another discussion with Vickie reaffirming that their mother wants nothing to do with her. He makes some final touches around the house and then begins getting ready. We see from his wardrobe that he hasn't been shopping in decades; he finally decides on what looks like a suit he wore to prom. He walks down the hall looking cleanly dressed and quite dapper in a burgundy suit with white shirt and matching tie. He waits for his guest.

After waiting 45 minutes and updating his online viewers that he may have given Edward the wrong directions, he calls Edward to check on him. Gloria answers the phone, so he pretends to be a Mr. Jones calling for business reasons. When she refuses to allow him to speak with Edward, he begins to unravel, threatening her that he will not allow her to ruin what he has sacrificed so much for. And we see what may have happened when he murdered his mother. He takes a baseball bat and trashes the dining room, bashing a blue female statue to pieces. Broken and emotionally drained, he explains to Eve the fish that he now knows what must be done. He and Edward will be together, either in this world or the next.

Peter is awakened the next morning by Vickie's call; she tells him that a murder has been reported on the news. He turns the TV on and hears that an African American female's body has been found and it is being considered a homicide. He tells her he must call her back and washes his face. His day is filled with multiple calls from Mrs. Carruthers, Mrs. Beasley, and Pastor Barrons asking about Lillian's whereabouts. He provides each with a different story or lie, reassuring them that she is fine and visiting friends in Mobile AL. He later calls Gloria to apologize for his erratic behavior and violent threats the night before and announces he will be moving. He gets a suitcase and begins packing for a trip. He shares with his viewers that he and Edward are going on a trip west. They will live alone in a house in the country, going to town for groceries in cowboy hats and boots. He is interrupted by a call from Edward.

He excitedly shares his plans for the two of them to run off together and finally be a couple. Edward tells him something that devastates Peter. He attempts to call Edward back but it goes straight to voicemail. Greatly disappointed, Peter retrieves his packed suitcase from the trunk of his car and puts his clothes and toiletries away then cleans up the mess from his tantrum the night before. He sits to type a letter of apology and suicide to Edward. Peter retrieves a shoe box filled with letters written to Edward by Peter, returned unopened. He gets all the medications from the bathroom and swallows them, then goes out to the car, where he has taped a hose to the tailpipe, and waits for the car to fill with fumes. Unable to keep the pills down, he throws up, then turns the engine off.

The next morning, Robert Beasley from church comes by the house, or does he? Peter looks out the peephole of the door, but there's no one there. There appears to be the shadow of a shoulder and it looks as if someone tries to break into the back door of the house but when Peter looks out the window to the front of the house there is still no one there and no vehicle in the driveway. Leaving the viewer to question if there was anyone at the door at all. Peter then sits at the table to eat his breakfast, but after seeing himself in the mirror, the mirror that also appears to be Lillian, he closes it and returns it to her bedroom. He returns to his viewers, now bald, and tells them about his brother Bobby's death. The camera pans to a memorial plaque dating Bobby's life from '62 to '81. Since Peter was only 6 in '81 it dawns on the viewer that the clothes Peter wears throughout the film must be those of his brother Bobby. He's been wearing Bobby's clothes throughout the film. Peter met Edward 18 years ago and knew that he and his mother would be great friends; now he reconciles himself to the fact that he has lost them both.

Peter receives one last call from Vickie where he seems to confess that their mother is dead. He tells Vickie that their mother loved her and gives her permission to contact the police now. He dresses, then gets a shotgun from the cabinet outside. He makes his final recording to his viewers and announces that the police are inside the house and coming down the hall. He thanks his viewers for their comments and offers words of wisdom and advice to hug your children. He seems to resign himself to being killed by the police for appearing to be armed and dangerous, despite the gun's being unloaded. Then quotes a verse from Revelations: "He who testifies to the things says yes I am coming soon. Amen." To prevent his viewers from watching his death, he then shuts the camera off and waits for the police to enter the bedroom.

Cast
David Oyelowo as Peter Snowden
Heather Storm as Newscaster 
Barlow Jacobs as Beasley

Production
On July 9, 2013, it was announced David Oyelowo would star in the film.

Release
The film premiered at the Los Angeles Film Festival on June 17, 2014. The film premiered on HBO on May 29, 2015.

Reception
Nightingale received positive reviews from critics, with Oyelowo's performance being praised. On Rotten Tomatoes, the film has a rating of 82%, based on 22 reviews, with a rating of 6.67/10. The website's critics consensus reads: "Nightingale serves up a breathtaking solo performance by David Oyelowo in a film served well by its modest cinematic style." On Metacritic, the film has a score of 67 out of 100, based on 13 critics, indicating "generally favorable reviews".

Sheri Linden of The Hollywood Reporter praised the film and wrote, "What makes the disturbing story gripping, beyond Oyelowo’s spellbinding performance, is its humor, defining compassion and incisive imagery." Joshua Aiston of The A.V. Club wrote that "the narrow perspective creates the disconcerting intimacy on which Nightingale thrives, but Lester’s strict adherence to it often feels compensatory and makes the film come across more like a conceptual exercise than a story."

The film did receive a number of negative reviews. Chuck Bowen of Slate wrote that "Nightingale is tediously literal-minded and anal-retentively 'worked out.' There's something stiflingly theoretical about the movie." Matthew Gilbert of The Boston Globe wrote, "What could have been an evocative journey into the mind of a lost veteran, as he opens up his thinking across a one-man show set entirely inside his house, is more like a quasi thriller revolving around a very mad hatter."

Oyelowo's performance was met with unanimous acclaim from critics. Alessandra Stanley of The New York Times wrote that "Mr. Oyelowo gives a riveting, disorienting and suspenseful tour of an unraveling mind".

Awards and nominations

References

External links
 

2014 films
2014 drama films
Films directed by Elliott Lester
HBO Films films
One-character films
American drama television films
2010s English-language films
2010s American films